Pattambi State assembly constituency is one of the 140 state legislative assembly constituencies in Kerala state in southern India.  It is also one of the 7 state legislative assembly constituencies included in the Palakkad Lok Sabha constituency. As of the 2016 assembly elections, the current MLA is Muhammed Muhsin of CPI.

Local self governed segments
Pattambi Niyamasabha constituency is composed of the following local self governed segments:

Members of Legislative Assembly

The following list contains all members of Kerala legislative assembly who have represented Pattambi Niyamasabha Constituency during the period of various assemblies:

Key

Election results 
Percentage change (±%) denotes the change in the number of votes from the immediate previous election.

Niyamasabha Election 2016 
There were 1,55,638 registered voters in the constituency for the 2016 election.

Niyamasabha Election 2011 
There were 1,53,713 registered voters in the constituency for the 2011 election.

1952

See also 
 Pattambi
 Palakkad district
 List of constituencies of the Kerala Legislative Assembly
 2016 Kerala Legislative Assembly election

References 

Assembly constituencies of Kerala

State assembly constituencies in Palakkad district